Rajyogini Dadi Janki (1 January 1916 – 27 March 2020) was an Indian spiritual leader. She headed the Brahma Kumaris movement, the world's largest spiritual organisation run by women.

Dadi Janki was 21 years old when she chose her spiritual path and became a founding member of Brahma Kumaris. Later in 1974, despite she spoke no English at the time, she moved to the United Kingdom to become an ambassador for the movement, and lived there for about 40 years.

References 

1916 births
2020 deaths
Indian Hindu spiritual teachers
Brahma Kumaris
Spiritual mediums
20th-century Hindu religious leaders
People from Hyderabad, Sindh